The 2013 North Miami mayoral election took place on May 14, 2013 and June 4, 2013, to elect the mayor of North Miami, Florida. The election was officially nonpartisan. Lucie Tondreau was elected after a runoff election between her and former mayor Kevin Burns. The first round was held on May 14, 2013.

First Round Results

References

2013
2013 United States mayoral elections
2013 Florida elections